The Lone Wolf is a 1924 American silent mystery film written and directed by Stanner E. V. Taylor based on a story by Louis Joseph Vance. This marked the final film of star Dorothy Dalton.

This is a remake of the 1917 film also titled The Lone Wolf.

Plot
As described in a film magazine review, Michael Lanyard, an international crook, refuses to join a band of Paris criminals in their attempt to steal valuable secret plans from the United States Government. He falls in love with Lucy Shannon, the trusted agent of the outlaws. The papers fall into the hands of Eckstrom, leader of the gang. Lanyard gets the plans back, but Eckstrom recovers them and flees in an airplane. Lucy and Lanyard follow him in another machine. Lanyard swings from a rope, boards his enemy's airplane, and then overpowers Eckstrom in a mid-air fight and secures the documents. Lanyard and Lucy deliver the plans to the authorities. She then reveals herself as a member of the secret service. Lanyard wins her love and a pardon.

Cast

Preservation
With no copies of The Lone Wolf located in any film archives, it is a lost film.

References

External links

1924 films
American silent feature films
Lost American films
Films based on short fiction
American black-and-white films
American mystery films
1924 mystery films
The Lone Wolf films
1924 lost films
Associated Exhibitors films
Films directed by Stanner E. V. Taylor
1920s American films
Silent mystery films
Lost mystery films
1920s English-language films